Martin Thalmann (born 5 September 1972) is a Swiss former professional footballer who played in the 1990s and early 2000s. He played mainly in the position as defender, but also as midfielder.

Career
Thalmann came through the youth system of FC Basel and advanced to their U-21 team 1990. He was called up to their first team many times in their 1990–91 season under head coach Ernst August Künnecke. He played his domestic league debut for the club in the home game in the St. Jakob Stadium on 22 December 1990 as Basel won 6–2 against Schaffhausen. In that season he played just two league matches. In the following season he was also called into their first team and had three appearances for them. Thalmann left FCB in the summer of 1992 and moved to FC Riehen.

In his two seasons with the club Thalmann played a total of 11 games for Basel's first team without scoring a goal. Five of these games were in the Nationalliga A and six were friendly games.

Thalmann later played for the German teams TSF Ditzingen and Waldhof Mannheim before moving to Schaffhausen in 1998, who at that time played in the second tier of Swiss football. In the 2000–01 season Schaffhausen suffered relegation.

References

Sources
 Die ersten 125 Jahre. Publisher: Josef Zindel im Friedrich Reinhardt Verlag, Basel. 
 Verein "Basler Fussballarchiv" Homepage

1972 births
Living people
Swiss men's footballers
Association football defenders
Association football midfielders
Swiss Super League players
Swiss Challenge League players
FC Basel players
TSF Ditzingen players
SV Waldhof Mannheim players
FC Schaffhausen players
Swiss expatriate footballers
Swiss expatriate sportspeople in Germany
Expatriate footballers in Germany